Antônio Leite Andrade (died 11 August 2020) was a Brazilian doctor and politician who served as a Senator.

References

1940s births
2020 deaths
Brazilian politicians